Lachlan Croker (born 12 December 1996) is an Australian professional rugby league footballer who plays as a  for the Manly Warringah Sea Eagles in the NRL. 

Croker previously played for the Canberra Raiders in the National Rugby League.

Background
Croker was born in Goulburn, New South Wales, Australia.

Croker played his junior rugby league for the Crookwell Green Devils and Goulburn Stockmen, before being signed by the Canberra Raiders.

Before deciding on Rugby League, he played for his high school's Rugby Union team, at Trinity Catholic College Goulburn, and was captain of the team for several years.

Croker is the nephew of former Canberra player and Australian international Jason Croker.

Playing career

Early career
From 2014 to 2016, Croker played for the Canberra Raiders' NYC team. On 11 November 2015, he re-signed with Canberra on a two-year contract until the end of 2017.

2016
In February, Croker got the chance to play with his uncle Jason at the 2016 NRL Auckland Nines. For the 2016 season, he captained the Raiders' NYC side. In round 2 of the 2016 NRL season, he made his NRL debut for Canberra against the Sydney Roosters. That would be his only NRL appearance for the season.

2017
Croker was unable to break back into Canberra's NRL side in 2017. In November, he signed a one-year contract with the Manly-Warringah Sea Eagles, starting in 2018.

2018
In round 1 of the 2018 NRL season, he made his debut for Manly-Warringah, playing at five-eighth 19-18 loss to the Newcastle Knights at Hunter Stadium. In round 2 against the Parramatta Eels, he scored his first NRL try 54-0 wins at Brookvale Oval. In round 8 against the Newcastle Knights, he suffered anterior cruciate ligament (ACL) knee injury.

2019
Croker made his long awaited return to the Manly side for their round 7 match against the Canberra Raiders.  Croker scored 2 tries in the game as Manly won 24-20.  The following week, Croker suffered a hamstring injury in the club's win over Canterbury and was ruled out for 4-5 weeks.

2020
Croker played 20 games for Manly-Warringah in the 2020 NRL season as they finished a disappointing 13th on the table.

2021

2022
In round 15 of the 2022 NRL season, Croker scored two tries for Manly and kicked a 40/20 in the clubs loss against North Queensland.  Manly had led the match 26-12 with seven minutes remaining but were defeated 28-26.
Croker played 23 games for Manly throughout the year as the club finished 11th and missed out on the finals.

References

External links
Manly Sea Eagles profile
Canberra Raiders profile
NRL profile

1996 births
Living people
Australian rugby league players
Canberra Raiders players
Manly Warringah Sea Eagles players
Mount Pritchard Mounties players
Rugby league five-eighths
Rugby league halfbacks
Rugby league players from Goulburn, New South Wales